A Journey to the Center of the Earth is a 1977 Australian animated film originally based on the 1864 novel Journey to the Center of the Earth by Jules Verne.  It was directed by Richard Slapczynski from a screenplay by John Palmer and produced by Walter J. Hucker.

References

External links
 

1977 animated films
1977 films
Australian animated speculative fiction films
Films based on Journey to the Center of the Earth
1970s Australian animated films
Films directed by Richard Slapczynski
1970s Australian films